Jacques Brown (first name pronounced "Jakes") (23 August 1900 – 3 April 1975) was a British radio producer. He produced Much-Binding-in-the-Marsh, The Goon Show, Beyond Our Ken and others for BBC Radio.

He was born Solomon Jacob Brown in Toxteth Park, Liverpool. A trumpet player in his youth, he had many stories to tell of being a jobbing musician in London in the 1920s. He performed in a number of minor acting roles before becoming a producer.

After retiring from the BBC to nurse his wife, who was seriously ill with cancer from which she later died, he helped his brother-in-law with his cake decorating business until his death, and the business folded after the postal workers strike of 1971.

He retired to Hampshire where he lived with an old friend, Mrs. W. I. Dismore, herself a widow, until his death, caused by complications after a car accident, on 3 April 1975.

Filmography

References

1900 births
1975 deaths
British television producers
Broadcast mass media people from Liverpool